Rivera de Vall is a locality located in the municipality of Arén, in Huesca province, Aragon, Spain. As of 2020, it has a population of 5.

Geography 
Rivera de Vall is located 138km east-northeast of Huesca.

References

Populated places in the Province of Huesca